Kyaukme Township is a township of Kyaukme District in the Shan State of eastern Burma (Myanmar). The principal town and administrative center is Kyaukme. The only other town is Mongngaw (Mongngawt) located in the northeast corner of the township.

References

External links
 "Kyaukme Google Satellite Map" Maplandia World Gazetteer
 "Kyaukme Township - Shan State" Map, 14 June 2010, Myanmar Information Management Unit (MIMU)

Townships of Shan State